Robin Jeremy Ord-Smith  (born 8 October 1965, died 20 September 2022) was a British diplomat.

He was educated at Ferndown Upper School and the University of Surrey (BSc). He joined the Foreign and Commonwealth Office in 1985, and was appointed British Ambassador to Tajikistan in 2012, then British Ambassador to Kyrgyzstan in 2015.

References

1965 births
Living people
Alumni of the University of Surrey
Ambassadors of the United Kingdom to Tajikistan
Ambassadors of the United Kingdom to Kyrgyzstan
Members of the Royal Victorian Order